The Georges Creek Railway  is a shortline railroad in Western Maryland that performed contract switching and owns a 14-mile line between Westernport and Carlos. The railroad was headquartered at 119 Pratt Street in Luke in the former Luke Post Office. Gerald Altizer and Pat Stakem are the primary partners in the company.

Operating since December 2007 on CSX Transportation and plant trackage, the firm did contract switching services for the Verso (formerly NewPage) Paper Mill in Luke.

An article in the Baltimore Business Journal dated April 30, 2019, announced the closing of the paper mill in Luke by June 30, which affected the employment of the GCK's Alco T-6.

Acquisition of the Georges Creek Subdivision
The acquisition of track for the Georges Creek Railway began 2005, the year CSX had begun the process of abandoning their Georges Creek Subdivision due to two washouts along the right-of-way and few customers. In December 2005, the deed for the northern 8.54 miles of track from Morrison, Maryland to Carlos, Maryland was transferred to WMS, LLC which would go bankrupt a year later due to investor difficulties. The following year, the Eighteen Thirty Group, LLC and Georges Creek Railway, LLC, filed to acquire and operate the line as Class III common carriers, having purchased the line out of bankruptcy court.

On May 15, 2015, Eighteen Thirty Group with the Georges Creek Railway, LLC filed a notice of intent to acquire 5.4 miles of rail line from CSX: 4.8 miles of the Georges Creek Subdivision between Barton and Westernport, and 0.6 miles of the Thomas Subdivision. The GCK entered an agreement with Eighteen Thirty Group to operate on these lines. This acquisition brought the entirety of the former Georges Creek Subdivision under the control of GCK.

As of March 2016, several right of way improvement projects had been undertaken, but the washouts were not repaired, keeping the line north of the village of Moscow inoperable.

Abandonment and rail conversion
Dockets numbered 1293X and 1294X and filed with the Surface Transportation Board on February 3, 2020, stated, "Eighteen Thirty Group, LLC (“Eighteen Thirty”) and Georges Creek Railway (“GCR”) file this Verified Notice of Exemption pursuant to the class exemption at 49 C.F.R. § 1152.50 for Eighteen Thirty to abandon and GCR to discontinue service over an approximately 7.54-mile rail line between milepost BAI 26.00 in Moscow, MD and milepost BAI 18.46 in Shaft, MD, all in Allegany County, MD (the “Line”). No local rail traffic has moved over the Line during the past two years. Any overhead traffic on the Line can be and has been rerouted."

An article in the Cumberland Times-News dated November 27, 2020 stated, "Allegany County officials approved an agreement last week with the Maryland Department of Natural Resources to move forward on plans to construct a hiking and bicycling trail in the Georges Creek area. The project would involve construction of a trail extending 7.5 miles from the Great Allegheny Passage in Frostburg along Georges Creek railroad lines to Barton." The article also stated, "[T]he rail lines through Georges Creek are owned by the Eighteen Thirty Group, which obtained them from CSX Transportation.... [T]he Eighteen Thirty Group has expressed interest in transferring rights to Allegany County with the Maryland Department of Natural Resources stepping forward to remove the tracks and install the trail." This action would replace the track the Georges Creek Railway has filed to abandon with a trail. This portion of the GCK has not seen a train in decades and is heavily covered in tree and brush growth.

Nine Dragons Paper Holdings Limited, which purchased the recycled-content bleached kraft pulp mill in Fairmont, West Virginia, was reportedly interested in buying the Luke plant in 2021. An article dated January 19, 2021 on the website of WCBC Radio stated in part "that a firm is close to finalizing an agreement to purchase the Luke Mill and its wood yard. The firm, known as Whiskey River, would establish a lumber related business at the mill, which was shuttered by Verso Corporation in May of 2019." By the end of 2021, however, the Luke Mill site remained dormant and there was no report of its purchase by any company. An article dated May 13, 2022 in the Mineral News and Tribune stated that mill's equipment and assets would be sold at a three-day auction starting on June 1, 2022. Capital Recovery Group, described as "a private equity firm that creates liquidity for its clients through expertise, innovative solutions and access to worldwide markets," according to the company’s website, had become the new owners of the former mill property. The auction of the equipment and assets leaves little likelihood the site will ever reopen as a paper mill again, and rail service to the former mill remains unnecessary.

Locomotives
On April 20, 2021, two Precision Locomotive employees from Staunton, Virginia, were making repairs and performing inspections on two ex-Georges Creek Railway locomotives, No. 7436 and No. 7471 at the southern end of the line in Westernport, MD. The Precision Locomotive employees said their company had purchased the locomotives a couple of weeks earlier and would soon be moving them off the line. To where, however, was still up in the air. It was possible they would go to the Western Maryland Scenic Railroad for storage until a third party wished to lease them or they could go to the closed ex-paper mill in nearby Luke, MD, which could have reopened with a lumber-related business, such as wood chips. Later in the year they were reported to be in storage at the WSMR yard in Ridgeley, WV.

Next to the closed shop in nearby Barton there were still four locomotives: 25, 39, 154 and 303. Also on site were an unmarked boxcar, two ex-Maryland and Pennsylvania Railroad hopper cars, and VGNX 67, a rusty, windowless bay window caboose of unknown heritage. (VGNX is the reporting mark of the Eastern Virginia Railroad Historical Society.)

There was a new addition to the scene, a former US Army troop train kitchen car showing faded Western Maryland Railway letters across the top and numbered K-3014. Minus trucks, it sits on atop stacked ties next to the former truck shop.

The GCK also has an Alco T6 numbered 101 at the mill. The Precision Locomotive technicians said the locomotive has been donated to the Roanoke Chapter NRHS which may be mainly interested in transferring its main generator to another T6 (ex-Chesapeake Western Railway) the chapter owns. As of that afternoon it was still at the plant and, unlike its shiny appearance when it first appeared on the scene, it was scruffy and its stack remained capped.

The Precision Locomotive technicians added that the remaining GCK locomotives are for sale.

Equipment roster
The Georges Creek Railway owned 11 diesel engines, two ex-MPA/WM hoppers, and one bay window caboose. The caboose, numbered 67 and in derelict condition, wears the reporting marks VGNX of the Eastern Virginia Railroad Historical Society. Additionally, there is an unmarked box car painted in rusty metal primer. With the exception of GCK 101 at the nearby closed paper mill in Luke, all of the line's equipment in the local area is stored next to a closed truck maintenance shop south of Barton, Maryland. The GCK's engine roster is enumerated in the table below.

A site visit on July 8, 2020, revealed that four locomotives (No.s 25, 39, 7436 and 7471), formerly stored in Westernport, had been moved to Barton on May 30, 2019, to reduce vandalism and theft. All four were clustered with the other rolling stock on site. Restoration work on No. 39 has ceased and No. 154 has reportedly been sold but has not yet left the property. Heavy brush growth all along the line is indicative of the complete lack of rail activity. The location of the stored equipment is south of the town limits of Barton, alongside Route 36 (New Georges Creek Road), by the intersection of Old Reynolds Road SW and Lower Georges Creek Road SW.

GCK 101, the lone locomotive assigned to work as the plant switcher in the closed paper mill in nearby Luke, was still on mill property.

By May 26, 2022, GCK 7496, an EMD SD40, had been moved from its long-term storage in a Norfolk Southern rail yard in Roanoke, Virginia, to a CSX yard in Cumberland, Maryland.

Note: No. 303 was reported as sold and departing the storage area south of Barton, MD, on September 12, 2022 via heavy truck for an unspecified destination in the southwestern USA. Its destination was subsequently revealed to be a railroad shop in Kansas City, Kansas, for restoration.

See also 

 Georges Creek Railroad (1853–1863) 
 George's Creek and Cumberland Railroad (1876–1917)

References 

Maryland railroads
Spin-offs of CSX Transportation
Railway companies established in 2007
Transportation in Allegany County, Maryland